The Black Watch is an infantry battalion of the Royal Regiment of Scotland.

Black Watch, blackwatch, or variant, may also refer to:

 The Black Watch (Royal Highland Regiment) of Canada
 Black Watch (full rigged ship), a 1877 large sailing ship built in Windsor, Nova Scotia
 MS Black Watch (1971), a cruise ship
 Black Watch (play), a 2006 Scottish play written by Gregory Burke
 Black Watch (wristwatch), made by Sinclair Radionics
 The Black Watch (film),  a 1929 film directed by John Ford
 The Black Watch (band), a  rock band
 42nd Regiment of Foot, the official title of the Black Watch regiment from 1739 to 1881
 Black Watch, a type of tartan

See also

 
 
 
 
 
 List of ships named Black Watch